St. Mary's Roman Catholic Church is a historic church at 320 Middle Avenue in Elyria, Ohio.

It was built in 1883 and added to the National Register of Historic Places in 1979.

References

External links
 Official website

Roman Catholic churches completed in 1883
Churches in the Roman Catholic Diocese of Cleveland
Churches on the National Register of Historic Places in Ohio
Gothic Revival church buildings in Ohio
Churches in Lorain County, Ohio
National Register of Historic Places in Lorain County, Ohio
Churches in Elyria, Ohio
19th-century Roman Catholic church buildings in the United States